Charli Petrov (born 18 October 2007) is an Australian diver. She won a gold medal at the 2022 Commonwealth Games, in Synchronised 10 m platform.

References

External links 

 
 

2007 births
Living people
Australian female divers
Commonwealth Games gold medallists for Australia
Commonwealth Games medallists in diving
Divers at the 2022 Commonwealth Games
21st-century Australian women
Medallists at the 2022 Commonwealth Games